Janez Albreht (born February 9, 1940) is a former Yugoslav ice hockey goaltender. He played for the Yugoslavia men's national ice hockey team at the 1976 Winter Olympics in Innsbruck.

References

1940 births
Living people
Ice hockey players at the 1976 Winter Olympics
Olympic ice hockey players of Yugoslavia
Slovenian ice hockey goaltenders
Sportspeople from Ljubljana
Yugoslav ice hockey goaltenders
HDD Olimpija Ljubljana players
Yugoslav expatriate sportspeople in Switzerland
Yugoslav expatriate ice hockey people
Expatriate ice hockey players in Switzerland